Avondale Bridge may refer to: 

Avondale Bridge (Arkansas River)
Avondale Bridge (Passaic River)